Haseldorf is a municipality in the district of Pinneberg, in Schleswig-Holstein, Germany. It is situated on the right bank of the Elbe, approx. 13 km west of Pinneberg, and 27 km west of Hamburg.

Haseldorf was the seat of the former Amt ("collective municipality") of Haseldorf.

References

Pinneberg (district)